Nether Denton is a civil parish in the Carlisle district of Cumbria, England.  It contains 14 buildings that are recorded in the National Heritage List for England.  Of these, One is listed at Grade I, the highest of the three grades, and the others are at Grade II, the lowest grade.  The parish contains the village of Low Row, and is otherwise rural.  The listed buildings include three former fortified houses, one in ruins.  The other listed buildings include houses, farmhouses and farm buildings, a former water mill, a church, and three milestones.

Key

Buildings

References

Citations

Sources

Lists of listed buildings in Cumbria